The 30th edition of the annual Hypo-Meeting took place on May 29 and May 30, 2004 in Götzis, Austria. The track and field competition, featuring a decathlon (men) and a heptathlon (women) event was part of the 2004 IAAF World Combined Events Challenge.

Men's Decathlon

Schedule

May 29

May 30

Records

Results

Women's Heptathlon

Schedule

May 29

May 30

Records

Results

See also
Athletics at the 2004 Summer Olympics – Men's decathlon
Athletics at the 2004 Summer Olympics – Women's heptathlon

References
 decathlon2000
 IAAF results
 leichtathletik

2004
Hypo-Meeting
Hypo-Meeting